Crispy pata is a Filipino dish consisting of deep fried pig trotters or knuckles served with a soy-vinegar dip. It can be served as party fare or an everyday dish. Many restaurants serve boneless pata as a specialty. The dish is quite similar to the German Schweinshaxe.

See also
 
 Bagnet
 List of deep fried foods
 List of Philippine dishes
 List of pork dishes
 Pata tim
 Philippine cuisine

References

Deep fried foods
Philippine cuisine
Pork dishes